is a private university with campuses in the cities of Ōsakasayama and Sakai in Osaka Prefecture, Japan. The predecessor of the school was founded in 1916, and it was chartered as a junior women's college in 1950. In 2007 the school became coeducational.

External links
 Official website 

Educational institutions established in 1916
Private universities and colleges in Japan
Universities and colleges in Osaka Prefecture
1916 establishments in Japan
Sakai, Osaka